Bujumbura Light University (or ULBU) is a private university located in Bujumbura, founded in 2000 by the Center for the Production and Distribution of Christian Literature (CEPRODILIC), a non-profit association in Burundi.

Schools and campus 
Faculties

 Faculty of Science and technology (Faculté de Science et technologie)
 Faculty of Theology (Faculté de Théologie)
 Faculty of Law (Faculté des Droits)
 Faculty of Business and Management (Faculté de Gestion et d'Administration)
 Faculty of Information technology (Faculté de Sciences Informatiques)
 Faculty of Science in communication and journalism (Faculté des Sciences de la Communication)

Campus

 Mutanga Nord Campus (main campus)
Kinindo Campus
Goma Campus (Democratic Republic of the Congo)

Public figures linked

Notable alumni

See also
 University of Burundi
 Hope Africa University

References

External links
  ULBU Homepage

 
Universities in Burundi
Educational institutions established in 2000
Universities and colleges in Burundi
Education in Bujumbura
2000 establishments in Burundi